Xernona Clayton Brady (née Brewster, born August 30, 1930) is an American civil rights leader and broadcasting executive. During the Civil Rights Movement, she worked for the National Urban League and Southern Christian Leadership Conference, where she became involved in the work of Dr. Martin Luther King Jr. Later, Clayton went into television, where she became the first African American from the southern United States to host a daily prime time talk show. She became corporate vice president for urban affairs for Turner Broadcasting.

Clayton created the Trumpet Foundation. She was instrumental in the development of the International Civil Rights Walk of Fame that was developed by the foundation to honor the achievements of African Americans and civil rights advocates. She convinced a Grand Dragon of the Ku Klux Klan to denounce the Klan. Clayton has been honored by the National Association for the Advancement of Colored People and the city of Atlanta for her work.

Early life
Xernona and her twin sister Xenobia were born in Muskogee, Oklahoma, the daughters of Reverend James and Elliott (Lillie) Brewster. Her parents were administrators of Indian affairs in Muskogee, Oklahoma. In 1952, Clayton earned her undergraduate degree with honors from Tennessee State Agricultural and Industrial College in Nashville, Tennessee. She majored in music and minored in education. At TSU, Clayton became a member of the Alpha Kappa Alpha sorority. She is a Baptist. She pursued graduate studies at the University of Chicago.

Career
Clayton began her career in the Civil Rights Movement with the National Urban League in Chicago, working undercover to investigate racial discrimination committed by employers against African Americans. Clayton moved to Atlanta in 1965, where she organized events for the Southern Christian Leadership Conference (SCLC), under the direction of Martin Luther King Jr. She developed a deep friendship with Dr. King's wife, Coretta Scott King. Clayton and Scott King traveled together on concert tours. Although Clayton did not march with King, citing a fear of being arrested, Clayton helped plan King's marches.

In 1966, Clayton coordinated the Doctors' Committee for Implementation, a group of African American physicians who worked for and achieved the desegregation of all Atlanta hospitals. The Doctors' Committee served as a model for nationwide hospital desegregation, and was honored by the National Medical Association.

Clayton then headed the Atlanta Model Cities program, a federally funded group dedicated to improving the quality of desegregated neighborhoods. Clayton met Calvin Craig, the Grand Dragon of the Georgia Ku Klux Klan, through the Model Cities program, as Craig served in a policy position with the organization. Craig cited Clayton's influence when he decided to denounce the Klan in April 1968.

In 1967, Clayton became the first Southern African American to host a daily prime time talk show. The show was broadcast on WAGA-TV in Atlanta and was renamed, The Xernona Clayton Show. Clayton joined Turner Broadcasting in 1979 as a producer of documentary specials. In the 1980s, she served as director of public relations for Turner Broadcasting. In 1988, Turner Broadcasting promoted Clayton to corporate vice president for urban affairs, assigning her to direct Turner projects and serve as a liaison between Turner Broadcasting and civic groups in Atlanta and throughout the country. Clayton retired from Turner Broadcasting in 1997, choosing to call the retirement a "professional transition".

Clayton serves on the board of directors of the King Center for Nonviolent Social Change. She served on the Board of Review for the state of Georgia's Department of Labor. In 1991, she published an autobiography, I've Been Marching All The Time, a title inspired by King. The book focused on her life and her views of the Civil Rights Movement.

In 1993, Clayton, with Turner Broadcasting, created the Trumpet Awards to honor achievements of African Americans. She serves as the chair, president, and CEO of the Trumpet Awards Foundation that was formed in late 2004. In early 2004, Clayton created the International Civil Rights Walk of Fame.

Personal life 
Clayton was a member of the Ebenezer Baptist Church, where Dr. Martin Luther King Jr. was the pastor.

Clayton was married to Ed Clayton (who also worked with Dr. King) from 1957 until his death in 1966. She co-authored a revised edition of her late husband's biography of Martin Luther King Jr. that is titled The Peaceful Warrior.

Following her first husband's death, Clayton married Paul L. Brady, the first African American to be appointed as a Federal Administrative Law Judge, in 1974. Brady and Clayton have two children from Brady's previous marriage, Laura and Paul Jr.

Honors
TSU honored Clayton at their Blue and White All-Star Academy Awards in 2005. Clayton's footprints were added to the International Civil Rights Walk of Fame in 2006. On May 1, 2011, Clayton received the James Weldon Johnson Lifetime Achievement Award from the Detroit branch of the National Association for the Advancement of Colored People (NAACP). She received the Local Community Service Award from Spelman College in 2004.

In September 2011, the Atlanta City Council renamed a street and a plaza at Hardy Ivy Park in downtown Atlanta in Clayton's honor. In conjunction with the National Newspaper Publishers Association, the AFC Enterprises Foundation awards an annual Xernona Clayton Black Press Scholarship amounting to $10,000 to a student pursuing a doctoral degree in journalism. The Mattel Toy Company created a "Xernona Clayton Barbie" doll in her honor in 2004.

Xernona Clayton has been honored worldwide for her contributions to humanity, which includes:  Bronze Women of the Year for Human Relations, 1969; Communications Woman of Achievement Award by the Atlanta Chapter of American Women in Radio and Television, 1984–85; Superior Television Programming Award by Iota Phi Lambda sorority, 1971; being named one of Georgia's Most Influential Women 1984 and Black Georgian of the Year 1984; being included in Leadership Atlanta, Atlanta Chamber of Commerce, 1971; named Bethune-Tubman Woman of the Year Award, Chicago, 1985; named Woman of the Year by Black Women Hall of Fame foundation, 1985; The Kizzy Award 1979; Humanitarian Award, Hillside International Truth Center, 1986; First Black woman to receive The Trailblazer Award by the Greater Atlanta Club Business and Professional Woman; named one of the nation's Top 100 Black Business and Professional Women by Dollars and Sense Magazine, 1985; being one of Seven Atlanta honorees for Black Achievers Award by the Equitable, 1986; being inducted into the Academy of Women Achievers by the YWCA, 1986; Communications Award by the OICs of America, 1986; American Spirit Award by the United States Air Force Recruiting Service, 1987; and receiving the President's Award by the National Conference of Mayors, 1983.

On International Women’s Day in 2023, the City of Atlanta unveiled a statue of Clayton in the plaza also named in her honor on West Peachtree Street. The location in downtown Atlanta was symbolic for Clayton, as she had been “thrown out of a hotel” on the street during the Civil Rights Movement.

Bibliography

References

1930 births
Living people
People from Muskogee, Oklahoma
Activists for African-American civil rights
American television executives
Women television executives
African-American television personalities
African-American women writers
American women writers
African-American writers
Tennessee State University alumni
Writers from Georgia (U.S. state)
Writers from Oklahoma
African-American women journalists
African-American journalists
American women journalists
American television talk show hosts
University of Chicago alumni
People from Atlanta
21st-century African-American people
21st-century African-American women
20th-century African-American people
20th-century African-American women